This is a list of female film and television directors. Their works may include live action and/or animated features, shorts, documentaries, telemovies, TV programs, or videos.

A

 Jennifer Abbott (Canada)
 Sarah Abbott (Canada)
 Jennifer Abod (USA)
 Marguerite Abouet (Ivory Coast)
 Abiola Abrams (USA)
 Mona Achache (France)
 Nan Achnas (Indonesia)
 Ally Acker (USA)
 Jill Ackles (USA)
 Kasia Adamik (Poland)
 Catlin Adams (USA)
 Joey Lauren Adams (USA)
 Perry Miller Adato (USA)
 Anita W. Addison (USA)
 Maren Ade (Germany)
 Harmony Adesola (Canada)
 Elvire Adjamonsi (Benin)
 Dianna Agron (USA)
 Yasmin Ahmad (Malaysia)
 Peggy Ahwesh (USA)
 Shirikiana Aina (USA)
 Kyōko Aizome (Japan)
 Omolola Ajao (Canada)
 Mania Akbari (Iran)
 Chantal Akerman (Belgium-France)
 Desiree Akhavan (USA)
 Zoya Akhtar  (India)
 Nargis Akhter (Bangladesh)
 Atuat Akkitirq (Canada)
 Zaynê Akyol (Canada)
 Haifaa al-Mansour (Saudi Arabia)
 Gina Alajar (Philippines)
 Barbara Albert (Austria)
 Karin Albou (France)
 Victoria Aleksanyan (Armenia)
 Lexi Alexander (USA)
 Debbie Allen (USA)
 Elizabeth Allen (USA)
 Jennifer Alleyn (Canada)
 Natalia Almada (Mexico-USA)
 Mairzee Almas (Canada)
 Chihiro Amano (Japan)
 Suzana Amaral (Brazil)
 Tata Amaral (Brazil)
 Barbra Amesbury (Canada)
 Ana Lily Amirpour (UK/USA)
 Bonnie Ammaq (Canada)
 Valerie Amponsah (Canada)
 Allison Anders (USA)
 Deborah Anderson (UK/USA)
 Gillian Anderson (USA)
 Jane Anderson (USA)
 Laurie Anderson (USA)
 Madeline Anderson (USA)
 Sarah Pia Anderson (UK/USA)
 Sini Anderson (USA)
 Kamila Andini (Indonesia)
 Momoko Ando (Japan)
 Fern Andra (USA)
 Scilla Andreen (USA)
 Joanna Angel (USA)
 Irene Angelico (Canada)
 Lucia Aniello (USA)
 Jennifer Aniston (USA)
 Catherine Annau (Canada)
 Martha Ansara (Australia)
 Jessie Anthony (Canada)
 Lisa Rose Apramian (USA) 
 Shamim Ara (Pakistan)
 Danielle Arbid (Lebanon)
 Louise Archambault (Canada)
 Francesca Archibugi (Italy)
 Fanny Ardant (France)
 Jane Arden (UK)
 Asia Argento (Italy)
 Allison Argo (USA)
 Kay Armatage (Canada)
 Aviva Armour-Ostroff (Canada)
 Franny Armstrong (UK)
 Gillian Armstrong (Australia)
 Alethea Arnaquq-Baril (Canada)
 Gwen Arner (USA)
 Andrea Arnold (UK)
 Patricia Arquette (USA)
 Rosanna Arquette (USA)
 Karen Arthur (USA)
 Natasha Arthy (Denmark)
 Larysa Artiugina (Ukraine)
 Ritva Arvelo (Finland)
 Dorothy Arzner (USA)
 Dinara Asanova (Soviet Union)
 Amma Asante (UK)
 Mari Asato (Japan)
 Katie Aselton (USA)
 Asinnajaq (Canada)
 Ratna Asmara (Indonesia)
 Dorothy A. Atabong (Canada)
 Daisy Aitkens (UK)
 Jacqueline Audry (France)
 Shona Auerbach (UK)
 Latesha Auger (Canada)
 Susan Avingaq (Canada)
 Ashley Avis (USA)
 Nurith Aviv (France)
 Ronit Avni (Canada)
 Tali Avrahami (Israel)
 Lisa Azuelos (France)

B

 Beth B (USA)
 Jamie Babbit (USA)
 Iskra Babich (Soviet Union)
 Julia Bacha
 Yamina Bachir-Chouikh (Algeria)
 Marina Rice Bader (Canada)
 Cindy Baer (USA)
 Jennifer Baichwal (Canada)
 Norma Bailey (Canada)
 Paule Baillargeon (Canada)
 Robin Bain
 Catherine Bainbridge (Canada)
 Josiane Balasko (France)
 Lucille Ball (USA)
 Marta Balletbò-Coll (Spain)
 Anne Bancroft (USA)
 Rakhshan Bani-Etemad (Iran)
 Elizabeth Banks (USA)
 Sofia Banzhaf (Canada)
 Manon Barbeau (Canada)
 Anaïs Barbeau-Lavalette (Canada)
 Laurence Ferreira Barbosa (France)
 Laura Bari
 Céline Baril (Canada)
 Neema Barnette (USA)
 Roseanne Barr (USA)
 Katherine Barrell (Canada)
 Cecilia Barriga (Chile)
 Drew Barrymore (USA)
 Maria Basaglia (Italy)
 Svetlana Baskova (Russia)
 Angela Bassett (USA)
 Michal Bat-Adam (Israel)
 Joy Batchelor (UK/USA)
 Kathy Bates (USA)
 Signe Baumane (Latvia/USA)
 Janet Baus (USA)
 Jordan Bayne (USA)
 Amanda Bearse (USA)
 Maria Beatty
 Marjorie Beaucage (Canada)
 Renée Beaulieu (Canada)
 Gabrielle Beaumont (UK/USA)
 André-Line Beauparlant (Canada)
 Aida Begić (Bosnia and Herzegovina)
 Fatma Begum
 Feryal Behzad (Iran)
 Nancy Beiman (Canada)
 Esther Bell (USA)
 Jennifer Lyon Bell (Netherlands/USA)
 Mary Lou Belli (USA)
 Edet Belzberg
 María Luisa Bemberg (Argentina)
 Jessica Bendinger (USA)
 Yamina Benguigui (Algeria/France)
 Sadie Benning (USA)
 Denyse Benoit (Canada)
 Amber Benson (USA)
 Emmanuelle Bercot (France)
 Amy J. Berg (USA)
 Zaida Bergroth (Finland)
 Shari Springer Berman (USA)
 Joyce Bernal (Philippines)
 Halle Berry (USA)
 Juliet Berto (France)
 Diane Bertrand (France)
 Julie Bertuccelli (France)
 Maïwenn Le Besco (France)
 Jane Marsh Beveridge
 Troy Beyer (USA)
 Pooja Bhatt
 Natalie Bible' (USA)
 Ric Esther Bienstock (Canada)
 Susanne Bier (Denmark)
 Kathryn Bigelow (USA)
 Anna Biller (USA)
 Patricia Birch (USA)
 Antonia Bird (UK)
 Roshell Bissett (Canada)
 Sophie Bissonnette (Canada)
 Justine Bitagoye (Burundi)
 Simone Bitton (Morocco)
 Marthe Blackburn (Canada)
 Sonia Blangiardo (USA)
 Katja Blichfeld (USA)
 Lidia Bobrova (Russia)
 Marusya Bociurkiw (Canada)
 Emily Kai Bock (Canada)
 Anna Boden (USA)
 Sofia Bohdanowicz (Canada)
 Sonia Bonspille Boileau (Canada)
 Sophie Farkas Bolla (Canada)
 Icíar Bollaín (Spain)
 Natalya Bondarchuk (Soviet Union/Russia)
 Lisa Bonet (USA)
 Sandrine Bonnaire (France)
 Manju Borah
 Uisenma Borchu (Mongolia)
 Lizzie Borden (USA)
 Joyce Borenstein (Canada)
 Shonali Bose (India)
 Karen Boswall (UK)
 Leyla Bouzid
 Kansas Bowling (USA)
 Muriel Box (UK)
 Maureen Bradley (Canada)
 Madeline Brandeis (USA)
 Maryann Brandon (USA)
 Netalie Braun (Israel)
 Janicza Bravo (USA)
 Anja Breien (Norway)
 Catherine Breillat (France)
 Zabou Breitman (France)
 Pietra Brettkelly (New Zealand)
 Amit Breuer (Canada)
 Manon Briand (Canada)
 Zana Briski (UK)
 Tricia Brock (USA)
 Beth Broderick (USA)
 Sandrine Brodeur-Desrosiers (Canada)
 Katrina Holden Bronson (USA)
 Katherine Brooks (USA)
 Julie Brown (USA)
 Christene Browne
 Frances Buss Buch (USA)
 Valerie Buhagiar
 Kathy Burke (UK)
 Nanette Burstein (USA)
 Mira Burt-Wintonick (Canada)
 Maria Burton (USA)
 Sophia Bush (USA)
 Akosua Busia (USA)
 Andrea Bussmann (Canada)
 Mary Ellen Bute (USA)

C

 Dominique Cabrera (France)
 Sophia Cacciola (USA)
 Anne-Marie Cadieux (Canada)
 Diane Cailhier (Canada)
 Terril Calder (Canada)
 Julia Cameron (USA)
 Jessica Cameron (Canada)
 Leah Cameron (Canada)
 Peg Campbell (Canada)
 Tisha Campbell-Martin (USA)
 Jane Campion (New Zealand)
 Kat Candler (USA)
 Jordan Canning (Canada)
 Dyan Cannon (USA)
 Kay Cannon (USA)
 Dominique Cardona (Canada)
 Fernanda Cardoso (Brazil)
 Patricia Cardoso (Colombia/USA)
 Maggie Carey (USA)
 Edith Carlmar
 Niki Caro (New Zealand)
 Ana Carolina (Brazil)
 Joan Carr-Wiggin (Canada)
 Albertina Carri (Argentina)
 Mélanie Carrier (Canada)
 Shelagh Carter (Canada)
 Kirsten Carthew (Canada)
 Alexandra Cassavetes
 Zoe Cassavetes (USA)
 Jacqueline Castel (Canada)
 Cecil Castellucci
 Liliana Cavani (Italy)
 Geneviève Dulude-De Celles (Canada)
 Jennifer Celotta (USA)
 Thea Červenková (Czechoslovakia)
 Gurinder Chadha (UK)
 Lydia Chagoll (Belgium)
 Ilene Chaiken (USA)
 Tanuja Chandra (India)
 Sylvia Chang (Taiwan)
 Lyne Charlebois (Canada)
 Martine Chartrand (Canada)
 Lilyan Chauvin (USA)
 Shu Lea Cheang (Taiwan)
 Shirley Cheechoo (Canada)
 Joan Chen (China)
 Evelyn Spice Cherry (Canada)
 Mabel Cheung (China)
 Sagari Chhabra (India)
 Patricia Chica (Canada/El Salvador)
 Abigail Child (USA)
 Aisling Chin-Yee (Canada)
 SJ Chiro (USA)
 Karen Cho (Canada)
 Monia Chokri (Canada)
 Lisa Cholodenko (USA)
 Joyce Chopra (USA)
 Zero Chou
 Deborah Chow (Canada)
 Věra Chytilová (Czech Republic)
 Katerina Cizek
 Julie St. Claire (USA)
 Shirley Clarke (USA)
 Millefiore Clarkes (Canada)
 Maja Classen
 Marie Clements (Canada)
 Jub Clerc (Australia)
 Susan Cohen
 Yulie Cohen (Israel)
 Isabel Coixet (Spain)
 Giada Colagrande (Italy)
 Fabienne Colas (Canada)
 Laurie Colbert (Canada)
 Janis Cole (Canada)
 Cristina Comencini (Italy)
 Nicole Conn (USA)
 Heather Connell (USA)
 Lisa Connor (USA)
 Janice Cooke-Leonard (USA)
 Martha Coolidge (USA)
 Nancy Cooperstein (USA)
 Eleanor Coppola (USA)
 Sofia Coppola (USA)
 Cristina Kotz Cornejo (USA/Argentina)
 Larissa Corriveau (Canada)
 Catherine Corsini (France)
 Ghyslaine Côté (Canada)
 Michèle Cournoyer (Canada)
 Marie-Hélène Cousineau (Canada)
 Courteney Cox (USA)
 Barbara Cranmer (Canada)
 Judith Crawley (Canada)
 Leanna Creel (USA)
 Jeanne Crépeau (Canada)
 Nancy Criss (USA)
 Suzanne Crocker (Canada)
 Emma-Kate Croghan (Australia)
 Catherine Crouch
 Fiona Cumming (UK)
 Carolynne Cunningham
 Shelley Curtis (USA)
 Thirza Cuthand (Canada)

D

 Cherien Dabis (USA)
 Nia DaCosta (USA)
 Eva Dahr (Norway)
 Holly Dale (Canada)
 Marie-Julie Dallaire (Canada)
 Tamela D'Amico
 Aimée Danis (Canada)
 Mireille Dansereau (Canada)
 Gia Darling
 Joan Darling (USA)
 Rima Das (India)
 Julie Dash (USA)
 Charlotte Dauphin (France)
 Byambasuren Davaa (Mongolia/Germany)
 Dorothy Davenport (USA) (also as Mrs. Wallace Reid)
 Marie Davignon (Canada)
 Tamra Davis (USA)
 Roxann Dawson (USA)
 Deborah Day (Canada)
 Linda Day (USA)
 Camille de Casabianca (France)
 Laura de Jonge (Canada)
 Maria de Medeiros (Portugal)
 Miranda de Pencier (Canada)
 Charlotte de Turckheim (France)
 Marina de Van (France)
 Autumn de Wilde (USA)
 Rowan Deacon (UK)
 Tracey Deer (Canada)
 Regine Deforges (France)
 Donna Deitch (USA)
 Katrina del Mar (USA)
 Julie Delpy (France/USA)
 Paula Delsol (France)
 Claire Denis (France)
 Pouran Derakhshandeh  (Iran)
 Sophie Deraspe (Canada)
 Maya Deren (USA)
 Dhvani Desai (India)
 Virginie Despentes (France)
 Arundhati Devi (India)
 Aminder Dhaliwal (Canada)
 Aishwarya R. Dhanush (India)
 Katherine Dieckmann (USA)
 Susie Dietter (USA)
 Nia Dinata (Indonesia)
 Mati Diop (France)
 Zoe Dirse (Canada)
 Abigail Disney (USA)
 Leila Djansi (USA/Ghana)
 Assia Djebar (Algeria)
 Nana Djordjadze (Georgia)
 Shannen Doherty (USA)
 Gail Dolgin (USA)
 Trish Dolman (Canada)
 Mary Agnes Donoghue (USA)
 Mia Donovan (Canada)
 Andrea Dorfman (Canada)
 Anita Doron (Canada)
 Doris Dörrie (Germany)
 Nicole Dorsey (Canada)
 Illeana Douglas (USA)
 Elissa Down (Australia)
 Rosvita Dransfeld (Canada)
 Polly Draper (USA)
 Fran Drescher (USA)
 Marie Dressler (Canada)
 Mr. and Mrs. Sidney Drew
 Kate Drummond (Canada)
 Germaine Dulac (France)
 Alma Duncan (Canada)
 Lena Dunham (USA)
 Cheryl Dunye (Liberia/USA)
 Sophie Dupuis (Canada)
 Marguerite Duras (France)
 Clea DuVall (USA)
 Ava DuVernay (USA)
 Gaëlle d'Ynglemare (Canada)

E

 Christine Edzard (France)
 Blessing Effiom Egbe (Nigeria)
 Michelle Ehlen (USA)
 Debra Eisenstadt
 Jihan El-Tahri
 Jan Eliasberg (USA)
 Phyllis Ellis (Canada)
 Bille Eltringham (UK/USA)
 Sheri Elwood (Canada)
 Erma Elzy-Jones (USA)
 Anne Émond (Canada)
 Esther Eng (USA)
 Diane English (USA)
 Jackie English (Canada)
 Ildikó Enyedi (Hungary)
 Nora Ephron (USA)
 Marie Epstein
 Abby Epstein (USA)
 Anna Eriksson (Finland)
 Deniz Gamze Ergüven
 Claudia Morgado Escanilla (Canada)
 Danishka Esterhazy (Canada)
 Bang Eun-jin (South Korea)
 Yasmin Evering-Kerr (Canada)
 Ewa Ewart (Poland)
 Valie Export (Austria)
 Tali Shalom Ezer (Israel)

F

 Trey Fanjoy (USA)
 Mitra Farahani
 Danielle Faraldo (USA)
 Coralie Fargeat (France)
 Valerie Faris (USA)
 Marianne Farley (Canada)
 Vera Farmiga
 Forough Farrokhzad
 Sepideh Farsi
 Safi Faye (Senegal)
 Daniela Fejerman  (Argentina)
 Rachel Feldman (USA)
 Emerald Fennell (UK)
 Lynne Fernie (Canada)
 Pascale Ferran (France)
 Pepita Ferrari (Canada)
 Sally Field (USA)
 Chip Fields (USA)
 Kim Fields (USA)
 Martha Fiennes (UK)
 Sophie Fiennes (UK)
 Denise Filiatrault
 Lee Filipovski (Canada)
 Roberta Findlay (USA)
 Frauke Finsterwalder (Germany)
 Jenna Fischer (USA)
 Jennifer Flackett (USA)
 Tracy Flannigan
 Luise Fleck
 Ann Marie Fleming (Canada)
 Anne Fletcher (USA)
 Shannon Flynn (USA)
 Anna Foerster
 Susanna Fogel (USA)
 Cheryl Foggo (Canada)
 Deanne Foley (Canada)
 Sheree Folkson
 Megan Follows (Canada)
 Anne Fontaine (Luxembourg)
 Maya Forbes (USA)
 Amanda Forbis (Canada)
 Victoria Forester (Canada)
 Sadaf Foroughi (Iran)
 Kyllikki Forssell (Finland)
 Sarah Fortin (Canada)
 Gwendolyn Audrey Foster (USA)
 Jodie Foster (USA)
 Kathryn Foster (USA)
 Lilibet Foster (USA)
 Tori Foster (Canada)
 Beryl Fox (Canada)
 Jennifer Fox
 Sarain Fox (Canada)
 Rana Abu Fraihah (Palestine/Israel)
 Bonnie Franklin (USA)
 Raquel Freire (Portugal)
 Camelia Frieberg (Canada)
 Liz Friedlander (USA)
 Kim Friedman
 Vivi Friedman (Finland/USA)
 Kim Friedman (USA)
 Su Friedrich (USA)
 Shirley Frimpong-Manso
 Grete Frische
 Sarah Frost (USA)
 Soleil Moon Frye (USA)
 Pamela Fryman (USA)
 Kei Fujiwara
 Mellissa Fung (Canada)
 Kelly Fyffe-Marshall (Canada)

G

 Bethany Joy Galeotti (USA)
 Maya Gallus (Canada)
 Nisha Ganatra (Canada)
 Liz Garbus (USA)
 Emmanuelle Schick Garcia (Canada)
 Nicole Garcia (French Algiers)
 Jennifer Garner (USA)
 Jem Garrard (Canada)
 Katy Garretson (USA)
 Jennie Garth (USA)
 Karen Gaviola (USA)
 Julie Gavras (France)
 Sarah Gavron (UK)
 Katrin Gebbe (Germany)
 Ngardy Conteh George (Canada)
 Geretta Geretta
 Valeriya Gai Germanika (Russia)
 Greta Gerwig (USA)
 Jennifer Getzinger (USA)
 Tina Gharavi (Iran/USA/UK/NZ)
 Coky Giedroyc (UK)
 Maria Giese (USA)
 Melody Gilbert
 Melissa Gilbert (USA)
 Leah Gilliam (USA)
 Abby Ginzberg (USA)
 Tess Girard (Canada)
 Lillian Gish (USA)
 Ellen Gittelsohn (USA)
 Lesli Linka Glatter (USA)
 Delphine Gleize (France)
 Alesia Glidewell (USA)
 Lana Gogoberidze (Soviet Union/Georgia)
 Dana Goldberg (Israel)
 Whoopi Goldberg (USA)
 Valeria Golino (Italy)
 Rosser Goodman (USA)
 Dennie Gordon (USA)
 Marleen Gorris (Netherlands)
 Rachel Goslins
 Lisa Gottlieb (USA)
 Danis Goulet (Canada)
 Sophie Goyette (Canada)
 Marita Grabiak (USA)
 Briar Grace-Smith (New Zealand)
 Debra Granik (USA)
 Anais Granofsky (Canada)
 Lee Grant (USA)
 Susannah Grant (USA)
 Janet Greek (USA)
 Lynnie Greene (USA)
 Amy Greenfield
 Lauren Greenfield
 Maggie Greenwald (USA)
 Annie Griffin (USA/UK)
 Allison Grodner (USA)
 Esther Gronenborn
 Patricia Gruben (Canada)
 Aurora Guerrero (USA)
 Gigi Saul Guerrero (Canada)
 Luce Guilbeault (Canada)
 Sonali Gulati (India/USA)
 Xiaolu Guo
 Jasmine Guy (USA)
 Alice Guy-Blaché (France/USA)
 Maggie Gyllenhaal (USA)

H

 Alli Haapasalo (Finland)
 Joana Hadjithomas (Lebanon)
 Lucile Hadžihalilović (France)
 Mona Zandi Haghighi (Iran)
 Helen Haig-Brown (Canada)
 Randa Haines (USA)
 Maha Haj (Palestine)
 Pam Hall (Canada)
 Sachi Hamano (Japan)
 Lisa Gay Hamilton (USA)
 Sylvia Hamilton (Canada)
 Tanya Hamilton (USA)
 Barbara Hammer (USA)
 Sanaa Hamri (Morocco/USA)
 Michelle Handelman (USA)
 Kristin Hanggi (USA)
 Teresa Hannigan (Canada)
 Marion Hänsel (Belgium)
 Mia Hansen-Løve (France)
 Banchi Hanuse (Canada)
 Neasa Hardiman (Ireland)
 Catherine Hardwicke (USA)
 Alicia K. Harris (Canada)
 Danielle Harris (USA)
 Emily Harris (United Kingdom)
 Mary Harron (Canada)
 Jackée Harry (USA)
 Bobbi Jo Hart (Canada)
 Melissa Joan Hart (USA)
 Phoebe Hart (Australia)
 Jessica Hausner (Austria)
 Goldie Hawn (USA)
 Gwen Haworth (Canada)
 Salma Hayek (Mexico/USA)
 Helaine Head (USA)
 Leslye Headland (USA)
 Julie Hébert (USA)
 Anne Heche (USA)
 Jen Heck (USA)
 Amy Heckerling (USA)
 Sian Heder (USA)
 Birgit Hein (Germany)
 Manijeh Hekmat (Iran)
 Marielle Heller (USA)
 Katherine Helmond (USA)
 Heather Hemmens (USA)
 Felicia D. Henderson (USA)
 Maryam Henein (Canada)
 Jill Hennessy (Canada)
 Astrid Henning-Jensen (Denmark)
 Kathleen Hepburn (Canada)
 Jennifer Love Hewitt (USA)
 Sachiko Hidari (Japan)
 Heather Hill (USA)
 Cheryl Hines (USA)
 Ivy Ho (Hong Kong)
 Lyndall Hobbs (Australia/USA)
 Victoria Hochberg (USA)
 Tamar Simon Hoffs (USA)
 Joanna Hogg (UK)
 Agnieszka Holland (Poland)
 Helen Holmes (USA)
 Peggy Holmes (USA)
 Nicole Holofcener (USA)
 Mahboubeh Honarian (Iran/Canada)
 Solveig Hoogesteijn (Sweden/Venezuela)
 Zoe Leigh Hopkins (Canada)
 Gwyneth Horder-Payton (USA)
 Rebecca Horn (Germany)
 Anna Maria Horsford (USA)
 Joan Horvath
 Sally El Hosaini (UK/Egypt)
 Dianne Houston (USA)
 Bryce Dallas Howard (USA)
 Tiffany Hsiung (Canada)
 Tasha Hubbard (Canada)
 Bronwen Hughes (Canada)
 Ann Hui (Hong Kong)
 Danielle Huillet (France)
 Bonnie Hunt (USA)
 Courtney Hunt (USA)
 Helen Hunt (USA)
 Nicki Hunter (USA)
 Tonya Hurley (USA)
 Anjelica Huston (USA)
 Sophie Hyde (Australia)

I

 Ansa Ikonen (Finland)
 Indrani (USA/India)
 Dana Inkster (Canada)
 Laura Innes (USA)
 Nyla Innuksuk (Canada)
 Diana Lee Inosanto (USA)
 Bodil Ipsen (Denmark)
 Elisapie Isaac (Canada)
 Debbie Isitt (UK)
 Lula Ali Ismaïl (Canada)
 Madeline Ivalu (Canada)
 Julia Crawford Ivers (USA)
 Sangita Iyer (Canada)

J

 Mehreen Jabbar
 Annemarie Jacir
 Lisa Jackson (Canada)
 Katie Jacobs (USA)
 Sarah Jacobson (USA)
 Jeong Jae-eun (South Korea)
 Wanda Jakubowska (Poland)
 Anna Elizabeth James (USA)
 Annabel Jankel (UK/USA)
 Agnès Jaoui (France)
 Sophie Jarvis (Canada)
 Marianne Jean-Baptiste (USA)
 Christine Jeffs (New Zealand)
 Patty Jenkins (USA)
 Tamara Jenkins (USA)
 Caytha Jentis (USA)
 Katherine Jerkovic (Canada)
 Slater Jewell-Kemker (Canada)
 Renuka Jeyapalan (Canada)
 Xiao Jiang (China)
 Liu Jiayin (China)
 Xu Jinglei (China)
 Stephanie Johnes (USA)
 Amy Jo Johnson (Canada)
 Karen Johnson (USA)
 Angelina Jolie (USA)
 Stephanie Joline (Canada)
 G. B. Jones (Canada)
 Rachel Leah Jones (USA-Israel)
 Meryam Joobeur (Canada)
 Hella Joof (Denmark)
 Yashira Jordán
 Mary Jordan (Canada/USA)
 Elena Jordi (Spain)
 Nana Jorjadze (Soviet Union/Georgia)
 Suma Josson (India)
 Petra Joy
 Maureen Judge (Canada)
 Miranda July (USA)
 July Jung (South Korea)
 Ingrid Jungermann (USA)
 Marie-Ève Juste (Canada)

K

 Wanuri Kahiu (Kenya)
 Shahnewaz Kakoli (Bangladesh)
 Alex Kalymnios (USA)
 Deborah Kampmeier
 Ellie Kanner (USA)
 Nelly Kaplan
 Betty Kaplan (Argentina)
 Deborah Kaplan (USA)
 Prema Karanth (India)
 Niki Karimi (Iran)
 Anna Karina
 Alexa Karolinski (Germany)
 Matia Karrell (USA)
 Nicole Kassell (USA)
 Daphna Kastner (Canada)
 Nancy Kates (USA)
 Ish Amitoj Kaur
 Mariko Kawana
 Naomi Kawase (Japan)
 Diane Keaton (USA)
 Elodie Keene (USA)
 Alan Rowe Kelly (USA)
 Jennifer Kent (Australia)
 Elza Kephart (Canada)
 Amanda Kernell  (Sweden)
 Sarah Kernochan (USA)
 Joanna Kerns (USA)
 T'Keyah Crystal Keymáh (USA)
 Dorota Kędzierzawska (Poland)
 Farah Khan (India)
 Callie Khouri (USA)
 Beeban Kidron (UK)
 Kaleena Kiff (USA)
 Ceyda Aslı Kılıçkıran
 Clare Kilner (USA)
 Gloria Ui Young Kim (Canada)
 Jacqueline Kim
 So Yong Kim (South Korea-USA)
 Regina King (USA)
 Eilis Kirwan (Ireland)
 Eriko Kitagawa (Japan)
 Bonnie Sherr Klein (Canada)
 Karen Knox (Canada)
 Ana Kokkinos (Australia)
 Kathy Kolla (USA)
 Frances Koncan (Canada)
 Larysa Kondracki (Canada)
 Barbara Kopple (USA)
 Torill Kove (Canada)
 Leonie Krippendorff (Germany)
 Ellen Kuras (USA)
 Diane Kurys (France)
 Karyn Kusama (USA)
 Julia Kwan (Canada)
 Sandra Kybartas (Canada)

L

 Nadine Labaki (Lebanon)
 Vlasta Lah (Argentina)
 Christine Lahti (USA)
 Kalpana Lajmi (India)
 Karen Lam (Canada)
 Evelyn Lambart (Canada)
 Alix Lambert (USA)
 Mary Lambert (USA)
 Micheline Lanctôt (Canada)
 Jessica Landaw (USA)
 Valerie Landsburg (USA)
 Samantha Lang (Australia)
 Yelena Lanskaya (USA/Russia)
 Tanya Lapointe (Canada)
 Brie Larson (USA)
 Michelle Latimer (Canada)
 Clara Law (China)
 Teza Lawrence (Canada)
 Tracie Laymon (USA)
 Alexandra Lazarowich (Canada)
 Margaret Lazarus (USA)
 Elizabeth Lazebnik (Canada)
 Lauren Lazin (USA)
 Caroline Leaf (USA/Canada)
 Jeanne Leblanc (Canada)
 Alexandra Leclère (France)
 Mimi Leder (USA)
 Carinne Leduc (Canada)
 Georgia Lee (USA)
 Helen Lee (Canada)
 Iara Lee (Brazil)
 Jennifer Lee (USA)
 Karin Lee (Canada)
 Min Sook Lee (Canada)
 Sook-Yin Lee (Canada)
 Wendee Lee (USA)
 Kat Lehmer (USA)
 Jennifer Jason Leigh (USA)
 Julia Leigh (Australia)
 Rita Leistner (Canada)
 Valérie Lemercier (France)
 Kasi Lemmons (USA)
 Marquise Lepage (Canada)
 Glory Leppänen (Finland)
 Chloé Leriche (Canada)
 Mira Lesmana (Indonesia)
 Chandler Levack (Canada)
 Naomi Levine (USA)
 Anne Lévy-Morelle (Belgium)
 Mary Lewis (Canada)
 Sharon Lewis (Canada)
 Li Yu   (China)
 Leslie Libman (USA)
 Yin Lichuan (China)
 Allison Liddi-Brown (USA)
 Rakel Liekki (Finland)
 Sharon Liese (USA)
 Georgina Lightning (Canada)
 Nnegest Likké (USA)
 Desiree Lim (Malaysia)
 Caroline Link (Germany)
 Tatyana Lioznova (Soviet Union)
 Christine Lipinska (France)
 Marion Lipschutz (USA)
 Lynne Littman (USA)
 Renata Litvinova (Russia)
 Jennie Livingston (USA)
 Ma Liwen (China)
 Claudia Llosa (Peru)
 Phyllida Lloyd (UK)
 Jayne Loader (USA)
 Sondra Locke (USA)
 Barbara Loden (USA)
 Julia Loktev (USA)
 Brenda Longfellow (Canada)
 Kim Longinotto (UK)
 Kamala Lopez (USA)
 Sophie Lorain (Canada)
 Ariane Louis-Seize (Canada)
 Juliana Luecking (USA)
 Agnieszka Lukasiak (Sweden)
 Kátia Lund (Brazil)
 Luo Luo (China)
 Ida Lupino (USA)
 Joy Lusco (USA)
 Noémie Lvovsky (France)
 Lottie Lyell (Australia)
 Dorothy Lyman (USA)
 Tucia Lyman (USA)
 Jennifer Lynch (USA)
 Lisbeth Lynghøft (Denmark)
 Gillian Lynne (UK)

M

 Kate Maberly (UK)
 Tina Mabry (USA)
 Hettie MacDonald (UK)
 Shauna MacDonald (Canada)
 Michelle MacLaren (Canada/USA)
 Angelina Maccarone (Germany)
 Allison Mack (USA)
 Barbie MacLaurin (UK)
 Alison Maclean (Canada)
 Aoife Madden
 Mary Madeiras (USA)
 Madhumitha
 Madonna (USA)
 Maria Maggenti (USA)
 Adriana Maggs (USA)
 Sharon Maguire (UK)
 Donatella Maiorca (Italy)
 Maïwenn (France)
 Taru Mäkelä (Finland)
 Hana Makhmalbaf (Iran)
 Samira Makhmalbaf (Iran)
 Sarah Maldoror (France)
 Yassamin Maleknasr
 Anna Malle
 Nancy Malone (USA)
 Laura Mañá (Spain)
 Gail Mancuso (USA)
 Babette Mangolte
 Suhasini Maniratnam (India)
 Ami Canaan Mann (USA)
 Andrea Mann
 Émilie Mannering (Canada)
 Michelle Manning (USA)
 Dinah Manoff (USA)
 Auli Mantila (Finland)
 Sophie Marceau (France)
 Frances Marion (USA)
 Eisha Marjara (Canada)
 Giulia Marletta
 Alina Marazzi (Italy) 
 Joanne Marcotte (Canada)
 Guylaine Maroist (Canada)
 Liz Marshall (Canada)
 Penny Marshall (USA)
 Tonie Marshall (France)
 Lucrecia Martel (Argentina)
 Catherine Martin (Canada)
 Darnell Martin (USA)
 Aurora Martinez
 Marsha Mason (USA)
 Laetitia Masson (France)
 Mary Stuart Masterson (USA)
 Anna Mastro
 Jean Mathieson (Canada)
 Yasmine Mathurin (Canada)
 Tomoko Matsunashi
 Gail Maurice (Canada)
 Elaine May (USA)
 Juliet May (UK)
 Melanie Mayron (USA)
 Patricia Mazuy (France)
 Trish McAdam (Ireland)
 Aoife McArdle (Ireland)
 Elske McCain
 Beth McCarthy-Miller (USA)
 Claire McCarthy (Australia)
 Naomi McCormack (Canada)
 Jennette McCurdy (USA)
 Paulette McDonagh (Australia)
 Sally McDonald (USA)
 Francine McDougall (Australia/USA)
 Christine McGlade (Canada)
 Molly McGlynn (Canada)
 Mary McGuckian (Ireland/UK)
 Danica McKellar (USA)
 Ashley McKenzie (Canada)
 Nancy McKeon (USA)
 Gillian McKercher (Canada)
 Tawnia McKiernan (USA)
 Sheila McLaughlin (USA)
 Carolyn McMaster (Canada)
 Chelsea McMullan (Canada)
 Lucile McVey (2nd Mrs. Sidney Drew) (USA)
 Nancy Meckler (UK)
 Ann Medina (Canada)
 Stella Meghie (Canada)
 Anisa Mehdi (Canada)
 Deepa Mehta (Canada/India)
 Vijaya Mehta (India)
 Hu Mei (China)
 Ursula Meier (France)
 Anna Melikian (Russia)
 Kay Mellor (UK)
 Linda Mendoza (USA)
 Weyni Mengesha (Canada)
 Nina Menkes
 Anjali Menon (India)
 Melanie Merkosky (Canada)
 Natalya Merkulova (Russia)
 Agnès Merlet (France)
 Marziyeh Meshkini (Iran)
 Márta Mészáros (Hungary)
 Leah Meyerhoff (USA)
 Nancy Meyers (USA)
 Liu Miaomiao (China)
 Maude Michaud (Canada)
 Vanessa Middleton (USA)
 Anne-Marie Miéville (Switzerland)
 Ina Mihalache (Canada)
 Gia Milani (Canada)
 Tamineh Milani (Iran)
 Amy Miller (Canada)
 Elisa Miller
 Rebecca Miller (USA)
 Sharron Miller (USA)
 Jacquelyn Mills (Canada)
 Pilar Miró (Spain)
 Fawzia Mirza (Canada)
 Efrat Mishori (Israel)
 Adrienne Mitchell (Canada)
 Dorothea Mitchell (Canada)
 Martha Mitchell (USA)
 Monika Mitchell (USA/Canada)
 Jill Mitwell (USA)
 Ariane Mnouchkine (France)
 Siue Moffat (Canada)
 Tracey Moffat (Australia)
 Hengameh Mofid
 Michelle Mohabeer (Canada)
 Hillie Molenaar
 Karen Moncrieff (USA)
 Nadine Monfils (Belgium)
 Caroline Monnet (Canada)
 Adriana Monti (Italy)
 Christine Moore (USA)
 Jocelyn Moorhouse
 Soudabeh Moradian
 Jeanne Moreau (France)
 Yolande Moreau (Belgium)
 Wendy Morgan (Canada)
 Stephanie Morgenstern (Canada)
 Makoto Moriwaki (Japan)
 Carol Morley (UK) 
 Judy Morris
 Dee Mosbacher
 Kim Moses (USA)
 Emilia Mosquito
 Granaz Moussavi (Iran)
 Jasmin Mozaffari (Canada)
 Katharina Mückstein (Austria)
 Nimisha Mukerji (Canada)
 April Mullen (Canada)
 Kira Muratova (Soviet Union)
 Beth Murphy
 Colleen Murphy (Canada)
 Alison Murray (Canada/UK)
 Tosca Musk (Canada)
 Jinna Mutune (Kenya)
 Anna Muylaert (Brazil)
 Gloria Muzio (USA)
 Toni Myers (Canada)

N

 Dana Nachman (USA)
 Fanta Régina Nacro
 Ruba Nadda (Arabia/Canada)
 Janice Nadeau (Canada)
 Phyllis Nagy (USA)
 Mira Nair (India)
 Najwa Najjar (Palestine)
 Laurel Nakadate (USA)
 Shasha Nakhai (Canada)
 Isabelle Nanty (France)
 Darlene Naponse (Canada)
 Terre Nash (Canada)
 Sandra Nashaat
 Afia Nathaniel (Pakistan)
 Zarqa Nawaz (Canada)
 Anjali Nayar (Canada)
 Lynne Naylor (Canada)
 Mariam Ndagire (Uganda)
 Jennifer Yuh Nelson
 Laura Neri (Belgium)
 Shirin Neshat
 Jennifer Siebel Newsom (USA)
 Carol Nguyen (Canada)
 Jill Nicholls (UK)
 Lisa Niemi (USA)
 Jessica Nilsson
 Mika Ninagawa (Japan)
 Vijaya Nirmala (India)
 Miwa Nishikawa (Japan)
 Michelle Nolden (Canada)
 Peg Norman (Canada)
 Mabel Normand (USA)
 Isabel Noronha (Mozambique)
 Elvira Notari (Italy)
 Lily Nottage (Canada)
 Maria Novaro (Mexico)
 Lynn Novick (USA)
 Radda Novikova (Russia)
 Cherie Nowlan (Australia/UK)
 Marti Noxon (USA)

O

 Mipo O (Japan)
 Claire Oakley (UK)
 Kim O'Bomsawin (Canada)
 Katharine O'Brien (USA)
 Shelagh O'Brien (Canada)
 Renee O'Connor (USA)
 Alice O'Fredericks (Denmark)
 Eileen O'Meara (USA)
 Alanis Obomsawin (Canada)
 Diane Obomsawin (Canada)
 Paula van der Oest (Netherlands)
 Naoko Ogigami (Japan)
 Mipo Oh (Japan)
 Linda Ohama (Canada)
 Annette K. Olesen (Denmark)
 Susan Oliver (USA)
 Madeleine Olnek (USA)
 Jenni Olson (USA)
 Gulshat Omarova (Kazakhstan)
 Yoko Ono (USA/Japan)
 Midi Onodera (Canada)
 Ngozi Onwurah (Nigeria-UK)
 Suemay Oram (UK-Brazil)
 Ruth Orkin (USA)
 Katrin Ottarsdóttir (Faroe Islands)
 Ulrike Ottinger (Germany)
 Halima Ouardiri (Switzerland/Canada)
 Jackie Oudney (UK)
 Akosua Adoma Owusu (USA)
 Jan Oxenberg (USA)

P

 Nisha Pahuja (Canada)
 Indrani Pal-Chaudhuri (USA, India, Canada, UK)
 Euzhan Palcy (Martinique)
 Gail Palmer
 Sai Paranjpye (India)
 Megan Park (Canada)
 Claire Parker (USA/France)
 Francine Parker (USA)
 Gudrun Parker (Canada)
 Molly Parker (Canada)
 Pratibha Parmar (Kenya/UK)
 Laura Parnes
 Christine Pascal (France)
 Stacie Passon (USA)
 Lesley Ann Patten (Canada)
 Paula Patton (USA)
 Nelofer Pazira
 Barbara Peeters (USA)
 Kimberly Peirce (USA)
 Andrée Pelletier (Canada)
 Francine Pelletier (journalist) (Canada)
 Alexandra Pelosi (USA)
 Nadine Pequeneza (Canada)
 Sumitra Peries
 Cristina Perincioli (Switzerland/Germany)
 Janet Perlman
 Ellen Perry (USA)
 Donna Pescow (USA)
 Kristine Peterson
 Lori Petty (USA)
 Jennifer Phang (USA)
 Carmine Pierre-Dufour (Canada)
 Ileana Pietrobruno (Canada)
 Lydia Dean Pilcher  (USA)
 Justine Pimlott (Canada)
 Carol Pineau
 Agnieszka Piotrowska (UK)
 Mary Kay Place (USA)
 Jennifer Podemski (Canada)
 Amy Poehler (USA)
 Anne Claire Poirier (Canada)
 Lindsey Pollard (Canada)
 Sarah Polley (Canada)
 Léa Pool (Switzerland/Canada)
 Leanne Pooley (New Zealand)
 Cynthia J. Popp (USA)
 Lourdes Portillo (USA-Mexico)
 Natalie Portman (Israel/USA)
 Franka Potente (Germany)
 Sally Potter (UK)
 Brigitte Poupart (Canada)
 Deborah Pratt (USA)
 Olga Preobrazhenskaya (Russian Empire/USSR)
 Ellen S. Pressman (USA)
 Gaylene Preston (New Zealand)
 Carrie Preston (USA)
 Claire Prieto (Canada)
 Gina Prince-Bythewood (USA)
 Kardeisha Provo (Canada)
 Lkhagvadulam Purev-Ochir (Mongolia)

Q

 Vivian Qu (China)
 Gracia Querejeta (Spain)
 Joanna Quinn (UK)

R

 Tahani Rached (Canada)
 Deborah Raffin (USA)
 Eliane Raheb (Lebanon)
 Yvonne Rainer (USA)
 Rajashree
 Soundarya Rajinikanth
 Peggy Rajski (USA)
 Bhanumathi Ramakrishna
 Lynne Ramsay (UK)
 Suze Randall
 Roopa Rao (India)
 Jenny Raskin (USA)
 Irma Raush (Soviet Union/Russia)
 Olga Rautenkranzová (Czechoslovakia)
 Trisha Ray
 Amy Redford (USA)
 Cleo Reece (Canada)
 Jennifer Reeder (USA)
 Dee Rees (USA)
 Kelly Reichardt (USA)
 Lotte Reiniger (Germany/UK)
 Catherine Reitman (Canada, USA)
 Revathi (India)
 Shabnam Rezaei (USA)
 Shonda Rhimes (USA)
 Cloudy Rhodes (Australia)
 Andrea Giles Rich (USA)
 Chantal Richard (France)
 Miranda Richardson (UK)
 Patricia Richardson (USA)
 Salli Richardson (USA)
 Yoruba Richen (USA)
 Lisa Rideout (Canada)
 Leni Riefenstahl (Germany)
 Nicole Riegel (USA)
 Patricia Riggen (Mexico/USA)
 Diana Ringo (Finland)
 Tristan Risk (Canada)
 Marialy Rivas (Chile)
 Joan Rivers
 Chloé Robichaud (Canada)
 Angela Robinson (USA)
 Jennifer Kaytin Robinson (USA)
 Julie Anne Robinson (UK)
 Melanie Rodriga
 Lina Rodriguez (Canada)
 Rosemary Rodriguez (USA)
 Gerry Rogers
 Juliana Rojas
 Sophy Romvari (Canada)
 Bethany Rooney (USA)
 Jeanne Roques  (France)
 Alison E. Rose (Canada)
 Lee Rose (USA)
 Sue Rose (USA)
 Elizabeth Allen Rosenbaum (USA)
 Rose Rosenblatt (USA)
 Tatia Rosenthal
 Theola Ross (Canada)
 Tracee Ellis Ross (USA)
 Vanessa Roth
 Stephanie Rothman (USA)
 Brigitte Roüan (France)
 Candida Royalle
 Patricia Rozema (Canada)
 Catarina Ruivo (Portugal)
 Marisa Ryan (USA)
 Marja-Lewis Ryan (USA)

S

 Jocelyne Saab (Lebanon)
 Randa Chahal Sabag (Lebanon)
 Lynne Sachs (USA)
 Jean Sagal (USA)
 Leontine Sagan (Austria-Hungary)
 Michelle St. John (Canada)
 Annie St-Pierre (Canada)
 Marie-Josée Saint-Pierre (Canada)
 Tazuko Sakane (Japan)
 Gabriela Samper (Colombia)
 Helke Sander (Germany)
 Helma Sanders-Brahms (Germany)
 Isabel Sandoval (Philippines) 
 Arlene Sanford (USA)
 Sangeeta (Pakistan)
 Satarupa Sanyal (India)
 Shamim Sarif (UK)
 Valeria Sarmiento (Chile/France)
 Inoka Sathyangani (Sri Lanka)
 Shimako Satō (Japan)
 Marjane Satrapi (Iran/France)
 Brigitte Sauriol (Canada)
 Savitri (India)
 Nancy Savoca (USA)
 Lorene Scafaria (USA)
 Lone Scherfig (Denmark)
 Suzanne Schiffman (France)
 Greta Schiller (USA)
 Jillian Schlesinger (USA)
 Roslyn Schwartz (Canada)
 Céline Sciamma (France)
 Jordan Scott (UK)
 Cynthia Scott (Canada)
 Nell Scovell (USA)
 Beverly Sebastion (USA)
 Lorraine Segato (Canada)
 Susan Seidelman (USA)
 Amy Seimetz (USA)
 Emma Seligman (Canada)
 Arna Selznick (Canada)
 Yoshiko Sembon (Japan)
 Aparna Sen (India)
 Lorraine Senna (USA)
 Amy Serrano (Cuba-USA)
 Coline Serreau (France)
 Mary Sexton (Canada)
 Beverly Shaffer (Canada/USA)
 Lee Shallat-Chemel (USA)
 Meher Afroz Shaon (Bangladesh)
 Kathleen Shannon (Canada)
 Jessica Sharzer (USA)
 Helen Shaver (Canada/USA)
 Tal Shefi (USA-Israel)
 Adrienne Shelly (USA)
 Angela Shelton (USA)
 Lynn Shelton (USA)
 Millicent Shelton (USA)
 Tali Shemesh (Israel)
 Larisa Shepitko (Soviet Union)
 Kirsten Sheridan (Ireland)
 Amy Sherman-Palladino (USA)
 Cindy Sherman (USA)
 Domee Shi (Canada)
 Ann Shin (Canada)
 Sofia Shinas (Canada)
 Nell Shipman (Canada)
 Tiffany Shlain (USA)
Tima Shomali (Jordan)
 Cate Shortland (Australia)
 Esfir Shub (Soviet Union)
 Mina Shum (Canada)
 Huang Shuqin (China)
 Mrs. Sidney Drew (USA)
 Trish Sie (USA)
 Evann Siebens (Canada)
 Lois Siegel (Canada)
 Floria Sigismondi (Canada)
 Joan Micklin Silver (USA)
 Barbara Simmons (USA)
 Lisa Simon (USA)
 Ellen Simpson (Canada)
 Madeleine Sims-Fewer (Canada)
 Anne-Marie Sirois (Canada)
 Thérèse Sita-Bella (Cameroon)
 Kari Skogland (Canada)
 Holly Goldberg Sloan (USA)
 Jean Smith (Canada)
 Alison Snowden (UK/Canada)
 Helena Solberg (Brazil)
 Yuliya Solntseva (Soviet Union)
 Frances-Anne Solomon (Canada/Trinidad and Tobago)
 Julia Solomonoff (Argentina)
 Mingmongkol Sonakul (Thailand)
 Safiya Songhai (USA)
 Susan Sontag (USA)
 Jen and Sylvia Soska (Canada)
 Jane Spencer (USA)
 Penelope Spheeris (USA)
 Jill Sprecher (USA)
 Avigail Sperber (Israel)
 Sylvia Spring (Canada)
 Emily Squires (USA)
 Nicole Stamp (Canada)
 Wendey Stanzler (USA)
 Casandra Stark (USA)
 J.A. Steel (USA)
 Paprika Steen (Denmark)
 Johanna Stein (Canada)
 Susan Steinberg (USA)
 Jennifer Steinman (USA)
 Katherine Stenholm (USA)
 Martha Stephens (USA)
 Stella Stevens (USA)
 Julie Stewart (Canada)
 Ginny Stikeman (Canada)
 Virginia L. Stone (USA)
 Lynne Stopkewich (Canada)
 Barbra Streisand (USA)
 Susan Strickler (USA)
 Susan Stroman (USA)
 Amanda Strong (Canada)
 Vera Stroyeva (Soviet Union)
 Sara Sugarman (UK)
 Sabiha Sumar (Pakistan)
 Vaishnavi Sundar (India) 
 Elizabeth Sung (Hong Kong)
 Alla Surikova (Russia)
 Mouly Surya (Indonesia)
 Lela Swift (USA)
 Brigitte Sy (France)
 Ramata-Toulaye Sy (France)
 Małgorzata Szumowska (Poland)

T

 Elle-Máijá Tailfeathers (Canada)
 Rea Tajiri
 Lisa Takeba (Japan)
 Tanya Talaga (Canada)
 Rachel Talalay (USA)
 Shashwati Talukdar
 Bhavna Talwar
 Amber Tamblyn (USA)
 Yuki Tanada (Japan)
 Kinuyo Tanaka (Japan)
 Loveleen Tandan
 Cyndi Tang (USA)
 Amanda Tapping (Canada/USA)
 Nadia Tass (Macedonia)
 Heather Taylor
 Sharine Taylor (Canada)
 Sam Taylor-Wood (UK)
 Julie Taymor (USA)
 Sakane Tazuko
 Valeria Bruni Tedeschi (Italy/France)
 Nathalie Teirlinck (Belgium)
 Suzie Templeton
 Angela Tessinari (USA)
 Joan Tewkesbury (USA)
 Lucy Thane
 Betty Thomas (USA)
 Madison Thomas (Canada)
 May Miles Thomas
 Pam Thomas (USA)
 Caroline Thompson (USA)
 Danièle Thompson (France)
 Jessica M. Thompson (USA/Australia)
 Jody Thompson (Canada)
 Lea Thompson (USA)
 Ninja Thyberg (Sweden)
 Wendy Tilby (Canada)
 Ondi Timoner (USA)
 Victory Tischler-Blue
 Stacy Title
 Kamala Todd (Canada)
 Loretta Todd (Canada)
 Maria Sole Tognazzi (Italy)
 Pamela Tola (Finland)
 Farkhondeh Torabi
 Gariné Torossian
 Fina Torres (Venezuela)
 Pimpaka Towira (Thailand)
 Sarah Townsend (UK)
 Wendy Toye
 Mouna Traoré (Canada)
 Lindalee Tracey (Canada)
 Jackie Traverse (Canada)
 Julie Tremble (Canada)
 Monika Treut (Germany)
 Nadine Trintignant (France)
 Lexie Findarle Trivundza (USA)
 Anne Troake (Canada)
 Fien Troch (Belgium)
 Rose Troche (USA)
 Alice Troughton (UK)
 Athina Rachel Tsangari (Greece)
 Susan Tully (UK)
 Marie-Hélène Turcotte (Canada)
 Guinevere Turner (USA)
 Aisha Tyler (USA)
 Hermína Týrlová (Czechoslovakia)

U

 Liv Ullmann (Norway)
 Sima Urale (New Zealand/Samoa)
 Urszula Urbaniak (Poland)

V

 Esther Valiquette (Canada)
 Agnès Varda (France; born in Belgium)
 Flore Vasseur (France)
 Pam Veasey (USA)
 Nicole Védrès (France)
 Ajita Suchitra Veera (India)
 Norma Safford Vela (USA)
 Ingrid Veninger (Canada)
 Katherena Vermette (Canada)
 Rhayne Vermette (Canada)
 Chris Vermorcken (Belgium)
 Myriam Verreault (Canada)
 Sandrine Veysset (France)
 Manuela Viegas (Portugal)
 Teresa Villaverde (Portugal)
 Vidhu Vincent (India)
 Michal Vinik (Israel)
 Bárbara Virgínia (Portugal)
 Wiebke von Carolsfeld (Canada)
 Katja von Garnier (Germany)
 Daisy von Scherler Mayer (USA)
 Margarethe von Trotta (Germany)
 Jürgen Vsych (USA)
 Johanna Vuoksenmaa (Finland)

W

 Lana & Lilly Wachowski (USA)
 Louise Wadley (Australia)
 Kristina Wagenbauer (Canada)
 Maria Wagner (USA)
 Sally Wainwright (UK)
 Lucy Walker (UK)
 Mary Walker-Sawka (Canada)
 Nancy Walker (USA)
 Dahvi Waller (Canada)
 Aisling Walsh (Ireland)
 Dearbhla Walsh
 Shannon Walsh (Canada)
 Laura Wandel (Belgium)
 Aloha Wanderwell (Canada)
 Lulu Wang
 Rachel Ward (Australia)
 Sarah Watt (Australia)
 Kim Wayans (USA)
 Dreya Weber (USA)
 Lois Weber (USA)
 Zhao Wei
 Claudia Weill (USA)
 Leilah Weinraub (USA)
 Andrea Weiss (USA)
 Valerie Weiss (USA)
 Aerlyn Weissman (Canada)
 Yvonne Welbon (USA)
 Audrey Wells (USA)
 Christine Welsh
 Jiang Wenli (China)
 Lina Wertmüller (Italy)
 Anne Wheeler (Canada)
 Sherry White (Canada)
 Susanna White (UK)
 Roxann Whitebean (Canada)
 Kanchi Wichmann (UK)
 Joyce Wieland (Canada)
 Nettie Wild (Canada)
 Olivia Wilde (USA)
 Dawn Wilkinson (Canada)
 Dena Williams (Canada)
 JoBeth Williams (USA)
 Tucky Williams (USA)
 Georgina Willis (Australia)
 Chandra Wilson (USA)
 Lois Wilson (USA)
 Margery Wilson (USA)
 Sandy Wilson (Canada)
 Doris Wishman (USA)
 Agnieszka Wojtowicz-Vosloo (USA)
 Christie Will Wolf (Canada)
 Mariloup Wolfe (Canada)
 Joyce Wong (Canada)
 Victoria Wood (UK)
 Kate Woods (Australia/USA)
 Jacqueline Wright
 Robin Wright (USA)
 Alice Wu (USA)

X

 Xue Xiaolu (China)

Y

 Naoko Yamada (Japan)
 Tizuka Yamasaki (Brazil)
 Chikako Yamashiro (Japan)
 Yūki Yamato (Japan)
 Cathy Yan
 Ruby Yang (China)
 Yong-hi Yang
 Pamela Yates (USA)
 Linda Yellen (USA)
 Ning Ying (China)
 Suzi Yoonessi
 Yumi Yoshiyuki (Japan)
 Aleysa Young (Canada)
 Heather Young (Canada)
 Byun Young-joo
 Nathalie Younglai (Canada)
 Jessica Yu (USA)

Z

 Samia Zaman (Bangladesh)
 Sara Zandieh (Iran/USA)
 Yolande Zauberman (France)
 Jasmila Žbanić (Bosnia/Herzegovina)
 Ona Zee (USA)
 Maryanne Zéhil (Canada)
 Mai Zetterling (Sweden)
 Chenyang Zhao (China)
 Chloé Zhao (China/USA)
 Zhang Nuanxin (China)
 Monica Zanetti (Australia)
 Binka Zhelyazkova (Bulgaria)
 Lydia Zimmermann (Spain)
 Magdalena Zyzak (USA)

See also

List of Female Academy Award winners and nominees for non-gendered categories
List of film and television directors
List of lesbian filmmakers
List of women writers
Women's cinema

Notes

References

Further reading

 

 
  (via Butler University Digital Commons.)
 
 
 
 
 
 
 
 Stephen Follows Film Data and Education. Film Data Reports – Cut Out Of The Picture: Gender in UK Film.
 
 

Video

External links
  Canadian Women Film Directors Database
  Cut-Throat Women
  The Director List: Women Directors at Work
  Free the Bid: Women Directors
  Women In Film & Television International
  Women In the Director's Chair (WIDC)
  Women Make Movies
  The Alice Initiative
  Film Fatales
  FemaleDirectors.com (films on Netflix and Amazon)
  Filmmakers at South Asian Women's NETwork (SAWNET) (archive)
  Center for the Study of Women in Television and Film at San Diego State University
  Women Film Pioneers Project (WFPP) at  Columbia University Libraries

Film and television directors
Film and television directors
Female film and television directors
Female